Nebria fallaciosa fallaciosa is a subspecies of ground beetle in the Nebriinae subfamily that is endemic to China.

References

Beetles described in 1992
Beetles of Asia
Endemic fauna of China